Roderick James Connolly (11 February 1901 – 16 December 1980) was a socialist politician in Ireland. He was also known as "Roddy Connolly" and "Rory Connolly".

Biography
The son of Irish socialist James Connolly and Lillie Connolly. A lieutenant in the Irish Citizen Army (ICA) boys' corps, he was involved in the 1916 Easter Rising. At the age of 15, he served in the GPO under his father. He joined the Socialist Party of Ireland in 1917.

Connolly traveled to Russia on several occasions in 1920 and 1921 and formed a close association with Vladimir Lenin and was hugely influenced by the Soviet leader. He was a delegate to the Second Congress of the Communist International (Comintern) as a delegate of the Industrial Workers of the World.

He helped form and became President of the first Communist Party of Ireland (CPI) in October 1921. He was editor of CPI newspaper, The Workers' Republic. He opposed the 1921 Anglo-Irish Treaty between the representatives of the Irish Republic and the British state, and fought in the Irish Civil War on the anti-treaty side. The CPI was the first Irish political party to oppose the Treaty and urged the IRA to adopt socialist policies to defeat the new Irish Free State government. The CPI was dissolved in 1924 by the Comintern but in 1926, Connolly helped set up a second Marxist party, the Irish Workers' Party. Connolly was the party leader and editor of its journal, The Hammer and Plough. This party too was dissolved in 1927.

Connolly joined the Irish Labour Party in 1928 and in 1934 participated in the last socialist initiative of Inter-War Ireland, the Irish Republican Congress. He was imprisoned twice in 1935. At the 1943 general election, Connolly was elected to the Dáil as a Labour Party Teachta Dála (TD) for Louth. He lost his seat at the 1944 general election, but was re-elected at the 1948 general election, before losing once more at the 1951 general election. Connolly was also financial secretary of the party from 1941 to 1949.

Connolly entered a semi-retirement between the mid-1950s and mid-1960s, but in the late 1960s, he began a comeback. He was elected as party chairman in 1971 and held this position until 1978. During his time as chairman Connolly oversaw the expulsion of the Socialist Labour Alliance in 1971, some of whose members would go on to form the Socialist Workers Network, which in turn eventually established People before Profit.

Connolly also sat in Seanad Éireann from 1975 to 1977 on the Cultural and Educational Panel. He was a supporter of the Labour Party–Fine Gael coalition government that was in power from 1973 to 1977, and defended the coalition from left-wing critics by reminding them his father James Connolly had allied with the likes of Patrick Pearse in 1916.

Connolly died in St Michael's hospital, Dún Laoghaire, in December 1980. He had both pneumonia and stomach cancer. Connolly is buried in Glasnevin Cemetery, Dublin.

References

1901 births
1980 deaths
People of the Irish Civil War (Anti-Treaty side)
Labour Party (Ireland) TDs
Irish socialists
Irish communists
Burials at Glasnevin Cemetery
Members of the 11th Dáil
Members of the 13th Dáil
Members of the 13th Seanad
Irish Comintern people
Irish schoolteachers
Deaths from stomach cancer
Industrial Workers of the World members
Labour Party (Ireland) senators
Irish Republican Army (1919–1922) members